Astrotischeria explosa is a moth of the family Tischeriidae. It was described by Annette Frances Braun in 1923. It is found in North America, including California.

References

Moths described in 1923
Tischeriidae